Stjepan Janić (born 24 November 1980 in Bačka Palanka, Serbia), is a Serbian and Croatian sprint canoer.

In 1998, he won his first silver medal as a member of the Serbia and Montenegro (then under Yugoslavia) crew which took the K-2 1000 m title at the World Championships in Szeged, Hungary. In 2004, he started competing for Croatia.

Janić is a member of the Kajak klub Jarun from Zagreb. He is 6’0” (1.84 m) tall and weighs 190 lbs (86 kg).  He is the son of Serbian canoer Milan Janić. His sister is Nataša Janić, a multiple canoe Olympic gold medalist for Hungary.

Janić competed at the 2008 Summer Olympics in Beijing, finishing seventh in the K-1 1000 m and ninth in the K-1 500 m events.

References

Sports-reference.com profile

1980 births
Living people
People from Bačka Palanka
Canoeists at the 2008 Summer Olympics
Croatian male canoeists
Olympic canoeists of Croatia
Serbian male canoeists
Yugoslav male canoeists
ICF Canoe Sprint World Championships medalists in kayak
Mediterranean Games gold medalists for Croatia
Mediterranean Games silver medalists for Croatia
Mediterranean Games bronze medalists for Croatia
Competitors at the 2005 Mediterranean Games
Competitors at the 2009 Mediterranean Games
Mediterranean Games medalists in canoeing